Gruppo Sportivo Bagnolese Associazione Sportiva Dilettantistica is an Italian association football club located in Bagnolo in Piano, Emilia-Romagna. It currently plays in Serie D.

History
The club was founded in 1914.

In the 2009–10 season Bagnolese was promoted for the first time from Eccellenza Emilia–Romagna/A to Serie D where it has played for the 3rd year consecutive.

Honours
Eccellenza Emilia-Romagna: 4
Winners: 1998–99 (group A), 2002–03 (group A), 2009–10 (group A), 2019–20 (group A)

References

External links
Official site

Football clubs in Italy
Football clubs in Emilia-Romagna
Association football clubs established in 1914
1914 establishments in Italy